Van der Meulen or Vandermeulen is a Dutch toponymic or occupational surname, meaning "from the (wind/water) mill" (modern Dutch molen). The even more common surname Vermeulen is a contraction of this name. Less common variants are "Van der Molen", "Vandermolen", "Ter Meulen", "Termeulen", "Van Meulen" and just "Meulen".

People 
Adam Frans van der Meulen (1632–1690), Flemish Baroque painter
Agnes van der Meulen (born 1947), Dutch badminton player
 Albert Jan van der Meulen (born 1940), paleontologist
Alice ter Meulen (born 1952), Dutch linguist
Augie Vander Meulen (1909–1993), American basketball player
Claes Pietersz van der Meulen (1642-1693), Dutch glass painter
Cornelis van der Meulen (1642–1691), Dutch painter
 (1894-1989), Dutch diplomat, explorer and writer 
Daniel Vandermeulen, Canadian educator
Gary Vandermeulen (born 1965), Canadian swimmer
Gejus van der Meulen (1903–1972), Dutch football goalkeeper
Hannie Termeulen (1929-2001), Dutch freestyle swimmer
Harm van der Meulen (1925–2007), Dutch trade unionist and politician
Helena van der Meulen, Dutch screenwriter, film critic and TV writer
Johan van der Meulen (1915–2005), better known as John O'Mill, Dutch writer
Kaat Van der Meulen (born 1995), Belgian racing cyclist
 (born 1949), Dutch film and television director
Laurens van der Meulen (1643-1719), Flemish sculptor and frame maker
Leendert van der Meulen (1937–2015), Dutch track cyclist
Marjolein van der Meulen (born 1960s), American biomedical engineer
Matthijs van der Meulen (1888-1967), Dutch composer and music journalist (in 1915 changed his name to "Matthijs Vermeulen")
Olof van der Meulen (born 1968), Dutch volleyball player
 (1525-1592), Flemish composer and organist
Sieuwert van der Meulen (1663-1730), Dutch painter
Stephen Vandermeulen (born 1965), Canadian swimmer
Steven van der Meulen (died 1563), Flemish-born English portrait painter
Thijs van der Meulen (born 1980), Dutch football defender
Timothy van der Meulen (born 1990), Dutch football defender
Tsjibbe Gearts van der Meulen (1824–1906), Frisian writer and poet
Yana van der Meulen Rodgers (born 1966), Dutch-born American feminist economist

Families

 Van der Meulen family, an old and important family of fish merchants in Brussels.

See also
Van der Molen
Vermeulen

References

Dutch-language surnames
Surnames of Dutch origin
Occupational surnames
Dutch toponymic surnames

de:Meulen
nl:Van der Meulen